René Paul Moreno was a Mexican footballer who played as a midfielder.

Career
He spent his entire career in the Mexican first division, mostly with Puebla F.C., where he won the 1982–83 league title and where he ranks 8th all-time in goals scored for the club with 45. He also played with C.D. Guadalajara and Correcaminos UAT during his club career. In 1994, he played his last tournament with Puebla, where he had also began his career. At international level, he played for the Mexico under-20 side in the 1983 FIFA U-20 World Cup. Following his retirement from football, he has still been active with Puebla FC and has even coached the club in 2005 when they played in the second division.

Honours
Puebla FC
Primera División Mexicana: 1982–83
Copa México: 1987–88

References

External links

1959 births
Living people
Mexican footballers
Mexico international footballers
Club Puebla players
Correcaminos UAT footballers
Association football midfielders
C.D. Guadalajara footballers
Footballers from Chihuahua
People from Delicias, Chihuahua
Mexico under-20 international footballers
Liga MX players